Taha Uku is a small bay on the north shore of Ta‘a ‘Oa (the Bay of Traitors) on the southern coast of Hiva ‘Oa.

The bay is provides one of the best anchorages in the whole of the Marquesas. It lies just to the east of Atuona, the administrative center of the southern Marquesas. Taha Uku is separated from Atuona Bay by a headland called Feki.

See also
 French Polynesia
 Marquesas Islands

Bodies of water of the Marquesas Islands
Bays of the Pacific Ocean